This is the list of cathedrals in Kazakhstan sorted by denomination.

Eastern Orthodox

Cathedrals of the Russian Orthodox:
 Assumption Cathedral in Astana
 Co-Cathedral of the Ascension of the Lord in Almaty
 Russian Orthodox Cathedral in Karaganda
 St. Michael's Cathedral in Uralsk
 Cathedral of St. Nicholas in Shymkent
 St. Nicholas Cathedral (Almaty)

Roman Catholic

Cathedrals of the Roman Catholic Church in Kazakhstan:
 Cathedral of Our Mother of Perpetual Help in Astana
 Cathedral of the Holy Trinity in Almaty

 Cathedral of the Our Lady of Fátima in Karaganda
 Cathedral of the Transfiguration of Our Lord in Atyrau

Former cathedral
 Cathedral of St. Joseph, Karaganda

See also

Lists of cathedrals by country
Christianity in Kazakhstan

References

Cathedrals in Kazakhstan
Kazakhstan
Cathedrals
Cathedrals